The U.S. Attorney for the District of Maryland is the chief federal law enforcement officer for the State of Maryland. Since October 2021, the United States Attorney for the District of Maryland is Erek Barron.

The United States District Court for the District of Maryland has jurisdiction over all cases prosecuted by the U.S. Attorney.

Organization
The Office is organized into divisions handling civil, criminal, and civil rights matters.

U.S. Attorneys for the District of Maryland
Richard Potts 1789–1792
Zebulon Hollingsworth 1792–1806
John Stephen  1806–1810
Thomas Beale Dorsey 1810–1812
Elias Glenn 1812–1824
Nathaniel Williams 1824–1841
Zaccheus Collins Lee 1841–1845
William L. Marshall 1845–1850
Zaccheus Collins Lee 1850–1853
William M. Addison 1853–1862
William Price 1862–1865
William J. Jones 1865–1866
William Price 1866–1867
Andrew Sterett Ridgley 1867–1869
Archibald Stirling Jr. 1869–1886
Thomas Gordon Hayes 1886–1890
John T. Ensor 1890–1894
William L. Marbury 1894–1898
John C. Rose 1898–1910
John P. Hill 1910–1915
Samuel K. Dennis 1915–1920
Robert R. Carman 1920–1922
Amos W. W. Woodcock 1922–1931
Simon E. Sobeloff 1931–1934
Bernard J. Flynn 1934–1953
George Cochran Doub 1953–1956
Walter E. Black Jr. 1956–1957
Leon H. A. Pierson 1957–1961
Joseph D. Tydings 1961–1963
Robert H. Kernon 1963
Thomas J. Kenney 1963–1967
Stephen H. Sachs 1967–1970
George Beall 1970–1975
Jervis S. Finney 1975–1978
Russell T. Baker 1978–1981
Herbert Better* 1981
J. Frederick Motz 1981–1985
Catherine C. Blake* 1985–1986
Breckinridge L. Willcox 1986–1991
Richard D. Bennett 1991–1993
Gary P. Jordan* 1993
Lynne A. Battaglia 1993–2001
Stephen Schenning* 2001
Thomas M. DiBiagio 2001–2005
Allen F. Loucks* 2005
Rod Rosenstein 2005–2017
Stephen M. Schenning* 2017–2018
Robert K. Hur 2018–2021
Jonathan F. Lenzner* 2021
Erek Barron 2021–present

*

References

External links
Thomas Library of Congress

United States Attorneys for the District of Maryland
Prosecution
1789 establishments in Maryland